The Keishichou Eagles are an American football team located in the Koto, Tokyo, Japan. They are a member of the X-League.

Seasons

References

External links
X League homepage

American football in Japan
1971 establishments in Japan
American football teams established in 1971
X-League teams